Mohammadabad (also Romanized as Moḩammadābād) is a village in Khir Rural District, Runiz District, Estahban County, Fars Province, Iran. At the 2006 census, its population was 1,268, in 323 families.

References 

Populated places in Estahban County